Once in a Lifetime: The Extraordinary Story of the New York Cosmos is a 2006 documentary film about the New York Cosmos, one of the most famous soccer clubs in the history of the United States.

Overview
The movie premiered on July 7, 2006 in New York City. Miramax distributed the film only in limited release. The movie combines the narration of veteran actor Matt Dillon with interviews with many of the team's legendary star players (with the notable exception of Pelé, who demanded a $100,000 fee and refused to participate when the producers declined to pay it) and footage of the team in the North American Soccer League in the late 1970s and early 1980s.

The film was released in conjunction with a companion piece book, Once in a Lifetime: The Incredible Story of the New York Cosmos, written by Gavin Newsham and released in 2006.

Reception
Critics gave the movie a positive review.

Original soundtrack album

Superb Records released the original soundtrack album the year after the film was released.  The soundtrack includes hits from the Motown and Funk genres.

Track listing
 Nothing But Soul - Junior Walker and the All Stars
 Who Is He And What Is He To You? - Creative Source
 Woman Of The Ghetto - Marlena Shaw
 Strange Games & Things - The Love Unlimited Orchestra
 Summer Madness - Kool & The Gang
 I Believe In Miracles - Jackson Sisters
 He's My Man - The Supremes
 Machine Gun - Commodores
 Cross The Tracks (We Better Go Back) - Maceo and The Macks
 I Feel Love - Donna Summer
 Disco MF - The Penfifteen Club
 U Gotta Fight! - KansasCali

References

External links
 
 Once in a Lifetime: The Extraordinary Story of the New York Cosmos (2006) on the Internet Movie Database
 Once in a Lifetime: The Extraordinary Story of the New York Cosmos (2006) on Rotten Tomatoes
 
 

Documentary films about association football
2006 films
New York Cosmos
Documentary films about New York City
2006 documentary films
American sports documentary films
Films produced by John Battsek
2000s English-language films
Films directed by Paul Crowder
2000s American films
Pelé